Modern yoga is a wide range of yoga practices with differing purposes, encompassing in its various forms yoga philosophy derived from the Vedas, physical postures derived from Hatha yoga, devotional and tantra-based practices, and Hindu nation-building approaches.

The scholar Elizabeth de Michelis proposed a 4-part typology of modern yoga in 2004, separating modern psychosomatic, denominational, postural, and meditational yogas. Other scholars have noted that her work stimulated research into the history, sociology, and anthropology of modern yoga, but have not all accepted her typology. They have variously emphasised modern yoga's international nature with its intercultural exchanges; its variety of beliefs and practices; its degree of continuity with older traditions, such as ancient Indian philosophy and medieval Hatha yoga; its relationship to Hinduism; its claims to provide health and fitness; and its tensions between the physical and the spiritual, or between the esoteric and the scientific.

Origins

Early modern yoga 

Yoga was presented to the Western world in different forms by Vivekananda, Madame Blavatsky, and others in the late 19th century. It embodied the period's distaste for yoga postures and hatha yoga more generally, as practised by the despised Nath yogins, by not mentioning them. Blavatsky helped to pave the way for the spread of yoga in the West by encouraging interest in occult and esoteric doctrines and a vision of the "mystical East". She had travelled to India in 1852-3, and became greatly interested in yoga in general, while despising and distrusting hatha yoga. In the 1890s, Vivekananda taught a mixture of yoga breathwork (pranayama), meditation, and positive thinking, derived from the new thought movement, again explicitly rejecting the practice of asanas and hatha yoga.

Yoga as exercise 

A few decades later, a very different form of yoga, the prevailing yoga as exercise, was created by Yogendra, Kuvalayananda, and Krishnamacharya, starting in the 1920s. It was predominantly physical, consisting mainly or entirely of asanas, postures derived from those of hatha yoga, but with a contribution from western gymnastics. They advocated this form of exercise under the guise of the supposed specific medical benefits of particular postures, quietly dropping its religious connotations, encouraged by the prevailing Indian nationalism which needed something to build an image of a strong and energetic nation. The yoga that they created, however, was taken up predominantly in the English-speaking world, starting with America and Britain.

De Michelis's four types 

The idea of yoga as "modern" was current before any definition of it was provided; for example, the philosopher Ernest Wood referred to it in the title of his 1948 book Practical Yoga, Ancient and Modern. Elizabeth de Michelis started the academic study of modern yoga with her 2004 typology. She defined modern yoga as "signifying those disciplines and schools which are, to a greater or lesser extent, rooted in South Asian cultural contexts, and which more specifically draw inspiration from certain philosophies, teachings and practices of Hinduism." With Vivekananda's 1896 Raja Yoga as its starting point, her typology of yoga forms as seen in the West, explicitly excluding forms seen only in India,  proposed four subtypes.

From the 1970s, modern yoga spread across many countries of the world, changing as it did so, and in De Michelis's view becoming "an integral part of (primarily) urban cultures worldwide", to the extent that the word yoga in the Western world now means the practice of asanas, typically in a class.

Other viewpoints

Endless variety 

Mark Singleton, a scholar of yoga's history and practices, states that De Michelis's typology provides categories useful as a way into the study of yoga in the modern age, but that it is not a "good starting point for history insofar as it subsumes detail, variation, and exception". Singleton does not subscribe to De Michelis's interpretative framework, instead considering "modern yoga" to be a descriptive name for "yoga in the modern age". He questions the De Michelis typology as follows: 

Modern yoga is derived in part from Haṭha yoga (one aspect of traditional yoga), with innovative practices that have taken the Indian heritage, experimented with techniques from non-Indic cultures, and radically evolved it into local forms worldwide. The scholar of religion Andrea Jain calls modern yoga "a variety of systems that developed as early as the 19th century as a [response to] capitalist production, colonial and industrial endeavors, global developments in areas ranging from metaphysics to fitness, and modern ideas and values." In contemporary practice, modern yoga is prescribed as a part of self-development and is believed to provide "increased beauty, strength, and flexibility as well as decreased stress". 

Modern yoga is variously viewed through "cultural prisms" including New Age religion, psychology, sports science, medicine, photography, and fashion. Jain states that although "hatha yoga is traditionally believed to be the ur-system of modern postural yoga, equating them does not account for the historical sources". According to her, asanas "only became prominent in modern yoga in the early twentieth century as a result of the dialogical exchanges between Indian reformers and nationalists and Americans and Europeans interested in health and fitness". In short, Jain writes, "modern yoga systems ... bear little resemblance to the yoga systems that preceded them. This is because [both] ... are specific to their own social contexts."

Leadership 

Modern yoga has been led by disparate gurus for over a century, ranging from Vivekananda with his Vedanta-based yoga philosophy to Krishnamacharya with his gymnastic approach, his pupils including the influential Pattabhi Jois teaching asanas linked by flowing vinyasa movements and B. K. S. Iyengar teaching precisely-positioned asanas, often using props. The gurus' approaches to yoga span the tantra-based Kripalu Yoga of Swami Kripalvananda and the Siddha Yoga of Muktananda; the Bhaktiyoga of Svaminarayana, as of Sathya Sai Baba; the "inner technology" of Jaggi Vasudev's Isha Yoga and Sri Sri Ravi Shankar's "Art of Living"; and finally the Hindu nation-building approaches of Eknath Ranade and of Swami Ramdev. Through the work of these gurus, yoga has been widely disseminated across the western world, and radically transformed in the process. Health benefits have been claimed; yoga has been brought to a "spiritual marketplace", different gurus competing for followers; and widely differing approaches have claimed ancient roots in Indian tradition. The result has been to transform yoga from "a hidden, weird thing" to "yoga studios on almost very corner", in a "massive transition from spiritual practice to focusing on health and fitness". The trend away from authority is continued in post-lineage yoga, which is practised outside any major school or guru's lineage.

The author and yoga teacher Matthew Remski writes that Norman Sjoman considered modern yoga to have been influenced by South Indian wrestling exercises; Joseph Alter found it torn between esoteric and scientific; Mark Singleton discovered a collision of Western physical culture with Indian spirituality; while Elliott Goldberg depicted "a modern spirituality, written through richly realized characters" including Krishnamacharya, Sivananda, Indra Devi, and Iyengar.

Cultural exchange and syncretism 

Suzanne Newcombe, a scholar of modern yoga, especially in Britain, writes that modern yoga's development included "a long history of transnational intercultural exchange", including between India and countries in the western world, whether or not it is an "outgrowth of Neo-Hinduism". It is seemingly torn between being a secular physical fitness activity sometimes called "hatha yoga" (not the similarly named the medieval practice of Haṭha yoga), and a spiritual practice with historical roots in India. She noted that the historical, sociological, and anthropological aspects of modern yoga were starting to be researched.

The scholar of religion Anya Foxen writes that "modern postural yoga", especially in America, was created through a complicated process involving both cultural exchange and syncretism of disparate approaches. Among the many ingredients are the subtle body and various strands of Greek philosophy, Western esotericism, and wellness programs for women based on such things as the teaching system of François Delsarte and the harmonial gymnastics of Genevieve Stebbins.

A contested relationship to Hinduism  

James Mallinson, a scholar of Sanskrit manuscripts and yoga, writes that 
modern yoga's relationship to Hinduism is complex and contested; some Christians have challenged its inclusion in school curricula on the grounds that it is covertly Hindu, while the "Take Back Yoga" campaign of the Hindu American Foundation has challenged attempts to "airbrush the Hindu roots of yoga" from modern manifestations. Modern yoga, he writes, uses techniques from "a wide range of traditions, many of which are clearly not Hindu at all". While yoga was integrated with Vedantic philosophy, "the first text to teach hathayoga says that it will work even for atheists, who ... did not believe in karma and rebirth".

Notes

References

Sources

External links

Modern Yoga Research website, managed by SOAS's Elizabeth De Michelis, Suzanne Newcombe, and Mark Singleton
What's behind the five popular yoga poses loved by the world? - a BBC Seriously... program and web page by Mukti Jain Campion

Modern yoga